Palubinskas is a Lithuanian language surname. It may refer to:

Ed Palubinskas, Australian basketballer
, Lithuanian politician, member of Seimas

Lithuanian-language surnames